Loui Jover (born April 1967) is an Australian painter and artist. He was born in Serbia but moved to Australia at a young age, where he has lived since. He is known for his artwork in ink wash paintings on vintage book pages. Jover started his work on art in his childhood, but did not start public art until 1989, when he joined the Australian army as an illustrator and photographer.

Early life
Loui Jover stated that he started painting as a child and carried on with his obsession for art in the Australian army. Loui Jover began painting in acrylics and oils and further on in his career he also did collage and sculpture.

Artworks
Jover designed two single covers for Cuban-American singer Camila Cabello for her singles "Crying in the Club" and "I Have Questions". He has also worked on some sculptural pieces, but is mainly known for his ink wash pieces on old book pages or newspapers etc. He reclaims the pages from damaged books that are otherwise headed for destruction. He considers himself a melancholic artist and loves the idea of negative nostalgia/ Feeling sad about a backstory or history- whether it's his own or somebody else's, or even an objects. He typically works in small segments and comes back to pieces every now and then to finish them in small chunks. This way, he can channel whatever emotion he is feeling at the time into different parts of the picture.

Inspiration
Jover says that he has always had a passion for art; he was inspired much by his father, who was also artistic, and by Pablo Picasso.

References

Living people
Australian artists
1967 births